Bilung (Chinese: 布隆; Pinyin: Bùlóng) is a township in Biru County, Tibet Autonomous Region of China.

See also
List of towns and villages in Tibet Autonomous Region

Notes

Populated places in Nagqu
Township-level divisions of Tibet